Asia Muhammad and Arina Rodionova were the defending champions, but they lost in the final to Alison Bai and Zoe Hives, 4–6, 6–4, [10–8].

Seeds

Draw

References
Main Draw

Bendigo Women's International - Doubles